New York State Route 316 (NY 316) is a state highway in Madison County, New York, in the United States. NY 316 serves as a connector between Oneida Lake and the city of Oneida, and it parallels Oneida Creek for its entire length. The route was assigned as part of the 1930 renumbering of state highways in New York, following what had previously been part of NY 31 during the 1920s.

Route description

NY 316 begins at an intersection with NY 46 in the outer reaches of the city of Oneida. The road heads to the northwest as the two-lane Lake Road, immediately passing through the linear Old Erie Canal State Historic Park before meeting County Route 76 (CR 76, named Canal Street) at a junction just outside the park limits. From CR 76, NY 316 runs past a handful of isolated homes and farms as it parallels Oneida Creek through the rural, northern section of the city. It eventually crosses into the town of Lenox, where it passes to the east of Kanon Valley Country Club a short distance from the town line. The town line also marks a change in the route's surroundings as the scattered homes give way to undeveloped open fields. NY 316 continues along the western edge of the creek, connecting to CR 11 (Oneida Valley Road) prior to entering the hamlet of Oneida Valley.

History
When NY 31 was assigned in the mid-1920s, it initially served the city of Oneida instead of bypassing it to the north as it does today. NY 31 turned southeast at the hamlet of Oneida Valley, following what is now NY 316 and NY 46 into downtown Oneida, where it ended at NY 5. In the 1930 renumbering of state highways in New York, NY 31 was realigned to follow its modern alignment east to Verona while its former alignment into Oneida was redesignated as NY 316. The route originally extended southward into downtown Oneida by way of an overlap with NY 46; however, the concurrency was eliminated by 1970.

Major intersections

See also

References

External links

316
Transportation in Madison County, New York